Waseem Isaacs (born 16 January 1991) is a South African soccer player who plays as a striker for Moroka Swallows.

Career
Before the second half of 2010–11, Isaacs signed for Slovak side MFK Zemplín Michalovce but left due to religious reasons. In 2013, he signed for Stellenbosch in the South African second tier, where he made 29 league appearances and scored 4 goals. On 18 September 2013, Isaacs debuted for Stellenbosch during a 0-0 draw with Santos (South Africa). After that, Isaacs signed for South African third tier club Crystal Palace.

In 2016, he signed for Cape Town All Stars in the South African second tier. In 2019, he signed for South African top flight team Stellenbosch. In 2020, Isaacs returned to Cape Town All Stars in the South African second tier. In 2021, he returned to South African top flight outfit Stellenbosch.

In summer 2022, Isaacs signed for Moroka Swallows on a two-year contract with an option for a third.

References

External links
 

1991 births
Living people
South African soccer players
South African expatriate soccer players
South African expatriate sportspeople in Slovakia
Expatriate footballers in Slovakia
Association football forwards
Stellenbosch F.C. players
Cape Town All Stars players
Ubuntu Cape Town F.C. players
MFK Zemplín Michalovce players
Moroka Swallows F.C. players